"LS engine" is the colloquial name given to the third and fourth generation small-block V8 gasoline engine used in General Motors' vehicles. The name evolved from the need to differentiate the Gen 3/Gen 4 small blocks from the original Gen 1/Gen 2 small blocks released in 1954, which are commonly referred to as "Small Block Chevrolets". The "LS" name originates from the engine RPO code of the first Gen 3 small block, the LS1, introduced in the 1997 Corvette. The term "LS engine" is used to describe any Gen 3 or Gen 4 Small Block Chevrolet engine, including those that do not specifically include "LS" as part of their RPO code. Sometimes referred to as an "LSx", with the lower case "x" standing in for one of the many RPO code variations of the motor, the term can cause confusion since GM now sells an aftermarket LS cylinder block named "LSX" with a capital "X". The original RPO code "LS1" is still sometimes used, if not confusingly, to describe the entire Gen 3/Gen 4 engine family.

LS engines were a clean sheet, modular design. Most components interchange between these Gen 3 and Gen 4 motors. When compared to the Gen 1/2 Small Block motors, LS engines share no interchangeable parts except connecting rod bearings and valve lifters.  Likewise, GM's fifth generation "LT" Small Block engines take inspiration from LS engines, but have almost no interchangeable parts.

All cars sold with LS motors were equipped with aluminum blocks, while most trucks received cast iron blocks. LS engines have several notable improvements over previous generations of small blocks. The lower section of the block incorporates deep side skirts along with 4-bolt cross-bolted main bearing caps and a structural cast aluminum oil pan. Nearly all LS motors were manufactured with high airflow aluminum cylinder heads, even in truck applications. The design uses long runner intake manifolds to enhance airflow within the engines operating range. These dry intake manifolds omit the coolant passages of earlier generations to minimize heat uptake in the air charge. They are made from a light weight yet durable nylon polymer. A large improvement was made to the ignition system by forgoing the camshaft driven distributor of the early small blocks in favor of valve cover mounted ignition coils, one for each cylinder. LS ignition timing is handled by the ECU via camshaft and crankshaft position sensors.

GM engineered the LS as a pushrod motor which was a controversial choice at the time. It was seen as an old-fashioned, low-tech decision that could not compete with the higher technology dual overhead cam (DOHC) designs that Ford had adopted. However, GM's decisions were justified by the LS engines' unprecedented success. Their choice kept the cost of the engines low, allowing them to be installed in a large variety of vehicles. The cam-in-block strategy kept the motor's external size smaller than a DOHC design, while still allowing 7.0L (427ci) displacements in stock form. Finally, well engineered cylinder heads and intake manifolds can allow high airflow in an LS engine. The combination of desirable attributes, low cost, and availability has earned LS motors a cult like following among engine swap hobbyists where slogans like "LS Swap the World" are echoed. Grassroots racers are now chasing stock bottom end (SBE) records pushing factory hardware in-excess of 1500 hp, and running 7 second 1/4 miles at 170+ with even the smallest (4.8L) displacements.

Much of the credit for this engine family must go to Ed Koerner, GM's Powertrain vice president of engineering operations at the time. He was a V8 design veteran and former National Hot Rod Association (NHRA) record holder in drag racing. Koerner had been the Chief Engineer for all the existing GM small-block V8 engines and was put in charge of the "all-new" Gen III LS1 V8 development project, which would share no parts with previous engines. Design team members included Alan Hayman, Jim Mazzola, Ron Sperry, Bill Compton, Brian Kaminski, Jon Lewis, Stan Turek, Don Weiderhold, and Dave Wandel.

Generation III (1997–2007)

The GM Generation I and Generation II (LT) engine families are both derived from the longstanding Chevrolet small block V8. The Generation III small-block V8 was a "clean sheet" design, which replaced the Gen I and Gen II engine families in 2002 and 1995 respectively.

Like the previous two generations, the Buick and Oldsmobile small blocks, the Gen III/IV can be found in many different brands. The engine blocks were cast in aluminum for car applications, and iron for most truck applications (notable exceptions include the Chevrolet TrailBlazer SS, Chevrolet SSR, and a limited run of Chevrolet/GMC Extended Cab Standard Box Trucks).

The architecture of the LS series makes for an extremely strong engine block with the aluminum engines being nearly as strong as the iron generation I and II engines. The LS engine also used coil-near-plug style ignition to replace the distributor setup of all previous small-block based engines.

The traditional five-bolt pentagonal cylinder head pattern was replaced with a square four-bolt design (much like the 64-90 Oldsmobile V8), and the pistons are of the flat-topped variety (in the LS1, LS2, LS3, LS6, LS7, LQ9, and L33), while all other variants, including the new LS9 and LQ4 truck engine, received a dished version of the GM hypereutectic piston.

The cylinder firing order was changed to 1-8-7-2-6-5-4-3 so that the LS series now corresponds to the firing pattern of other modern V8 engines (for example the Ford Modular V8).

3.898 in. bore blocks (1997–2005)
The first of the Generation IIIs, the LS1 was the progenitor of the new architecture design that would transform the entire V8 line and influence the last of the Big Blocks.

5.7L

The Generation III 5.7L (LS1 and LS6) engines share little other than similar displacement, external dimensions, and rod bearings, with its predecessor (LT1).

LS1
The LS1 was used in the Corvette from 97 to 04. The extra horsepower was claimed to come from the intake ram-air effect available in the SS and WS6 models.
Applications:

LS6

The LS6 is a higher-output version of GM's LS1 engine and retains the same capacity. The LS6 was originally only used in the high-performance C5 Corvette Z06 model, with the Cadillac CTS V-Series getting the  engine later. The V-Series used the LS6 for two years before being replaced by the LS2 in 2006. For 2006, the Z06 replaced the LS6 with the new LS7. The LS6 shares its basic block architecture with the GM LS1 engine, but other changes were made to the design such as windows cast into the block between cylinders, improved main web strength and bay to bay breathing, an intake manifold and MAF-sensor with higher flow capacity, a camshaft with higher lift and more duration, a higher compression ratio of 10.5:1, sodium-filled exhaust valves, and a revised oiling system better suited to high lateral acceleration.
LS6 intake manifolds were also used on all 2001+ LS1/6 engines. The casting number, located on the top rear edge of the block, is 12561168.

Applications:

3.78 in. bore blocks (1999–2007)
The 4.8 L and the 5.3 L are smaller truck versions of the LS1 and were designed to replace the 305 and the 350 in trucks.  The 4.8L and the 5.3L engines share the same Gen III LS-series engine block and heads (upper end) and therefore, some parts interchange freely between these engines and other variants in the LS family.

4.8L LR4
The Vortec 4800 LR4 (VIN code "V") is a Generation III small block V8 truck engine. It is the smallest of the Generation III Vortec truck engines and was the replacement for the 5.0 L 5000 L30. It uses flat top pistons.

Applications:

5.3 L
The Vortec 5300, or LM7/L59/LM4, is a V8 truck engine. It is a longer-stroked by  version of the Vortec 4800 and replaced the L31. L59 denoted a flexible fuel version of the standard fuel LM7 engine. Vortec 5300s are built in St. Catharines, Ontario and Romulus, Michigan. Another engine variant, the L33, shares the same displacement, but has an aluminum block with cast in cylinder liners, much like the LS1.

LM7
The Vortec 5300 LM7 (VIN code 8th digit "T") was introduced in 1999. The "garden variety" Generation III V8 has a cast-iron block and aluminum heads.

The stock cam specs at .050 lift are: 190/191 duration, .466/.457 lift, 114 LSA, 112/116 Timing

Applications:

L59
The Vortec 5300 L59 (VIN code "Z") is a flexible fuel version of the LM7.

Applications:

LM4

The Vortec 5300 LM4 (VIN code "P") is an aluminum block version of the LM7, and had a short production life, as did the specific vehicles in which LM4s are found.
It should not be confused with the L33 described below.

Applications:

L33

The Vortec 5300 L33 (VIN code "B") is an aluminum block version of the LM7, marketed as the Vortec 5300 HO. Instead of the LM7's dished pistons, the L33 uses the 4.8L's flat top pistons. It also uses 799 cylinder heads, identical to 243 castings found on LS6s and LS2s, lacking only the LS6-spec valve springs and hollow stem exhaust valves. This combination raised the compression from 9.5:1 to 10.0:1. The L33 also used a unique camshaft not shared with any other engine, specs at .050 duration are: 193 duration, .482 lift, 116 LSA. It was only available on extended cab short bed 4WD pickup trucks. Only 25% of 2005-made pickup trucks had an L33 engine.

Applications:

4.00 in. bore blocks (1999–2007)
The 6.0 L is a larger version of the LS motor. 6.0 L blocks were cast of iron, designed to bridge the gap between the new small blocks and big blocks in truck applications.  There were two versions of this engine: LQ4, and LQ9, the latter being more performance oriented.

6.0 L
The Vortec 6000 is a V8 truck engine.

LQ4
The Vortec 6000 LQ4 (VIN code "U") is a V8 truck engine. LQ4s are built in Romulus, Michigan and Silao, Mexico.

Applications:

LQ9
The Vortec HO 6000 or VortecMAX (VIN code "N") is a special high-output version of the Vortec 6000 V8 truck engine originally designed for Cadillac in 2002. This engine was renamed as the VortecMAX for 2006. LQ9 came exclusively with 4.10 gears. LQ9s are built only in Romulus, Michigan.

 2002–2006 Cadillac Escalade AWD
 2006 Cadillac Escalade 2WD
 2002–2006 Cadillac Escalade EXT
 2003–2006 Cadillac Escalade ESV
 2003–2007 Chevrolet Silverado SS
 2004–2006 Chevrolet Silverado and GMC Sierra Vortec HO Edition, Silverado/Sierra Performance Edition
 2005–2006 GMC Sierra Denali and Yukon Denali
 2007 Chevrolet Silverado and GMC Sierra Classic VortecMAX & Silverado/Sierra Performance Edition

Generation IV (2005–2020)

In 2004, Generation III was superseded by the Generation IV. Based on the Generation III design, Generation IV was designed with displacement on demand in mind, a technology that allows every other cylinder in the firing order to be deactivated. It can also accommodate variable valve timing.

A 3 valves per cylinder design was originally slated for the LS7, which would have been a first for a GM pushrod engine; but the idea was shelved owing to design complexities and when the same two-valve configuration as the other Generation III and IV engines proved to be sufficient to meet the goals for the LS7.

4.00 in. bore blocks (2005–present)
This family of blocks was the first of the generation IV small block with the LS2 being the progenitor of this family and generation.  This family of blocks has seen a wide range of applications from performance vehicles to truck usage.

6.0 L
It features either a cast iron or aluminum engine block with cast aluminum heads. Certain versions feature variable cam phasing, Active Fuel Management, and Flex-fuel capability.

LS2
LS2 can also refer to the 1973–1974 Super Duty  Pontiac V8 engine
LS2 can also refer to the 1985 Oldsmobile Diesel V6 engine.

The LS2 was introduced as the Corvette's new base engine for the 2005 model year. It also appeared as the standard powerplant for the 2005–2006 GTO. It is similar to the high-performance LS6, but with improved torque throughout the rpm range. The LS2 uses the "243" casting heads used on the LS6 (although without the sodium-filled valves), a smaller camshaft, and an additional . The compression of the LS2 was also raised to 10.9:1 compared to the LS1s' 10.25:1 and the LS6s' 10.5:1.

The LS2 is also used as the basis of the NASCAR Specification Engine that is used as an optional engine in NASCAR's Camping World Series East and West divisions starting in 2006, and starting in 2010 may also be used on tracks shorter than two kilometers (1.25 miles) in the Camping World Truck Series.

A version of NASCAR V8 cylinder block cast in Compacted Graphite Iron by Grainger & Worrall won the UK's Casting of the Year Award 2010.

 2005–2007 Chevrolet Corvette
 2005–2006 Chevrolet SSR
 2006–2009 Chevrolet TrailBlazer SS
 2006–2007 Cadillac CTS-V
 2005–2006 Holden Monaro family:
 2005–2006 Pontiac GTO (peak power at 5200 rpm, peak torque at 4000 rpm)
 2005–2006 Vauxhall Monaro VXR
 2005–2006 HSV Coupé GTO
 2005–2006 HSV SV6000
 2005–2008 HSV Clubsport R8, Maloo R8, Senator Signature and GTS
 2005–2008 HSV Grange
 2008–2009 Saab 9-7X Aero

L76
The L76 is derived from the LS2, and like the LS2 it features an aluminum engine block. However, the L76 does feature Active fuel management (AFM). While the displacement on demand technology was disabled on Holdens, this feature is enabled on the 2008 Pontiac G8 GT and subsequently refitted in the 2009 model Holdens with AFM enabled, but only on models fitted with the 6L80 Automatic Transmission. The engine also meets Euro III emissions requirements. The Vortec 6000 or new VortecMax version is based on the Holden L76 engine, and features variable cam phasing, along with Active Fuel Management. It can be considered the replacement for the Generation III LQ9 engine. Production of the truck-spec L76 started in late 2006, and it was only available with the new body style Silverado and Sierra, as well as the then-new Suburban. The final year for the truck-spec L76 was 2009 for all three applications; it was replaced by the 6.2L L9H engine for MY 2010 in the pickup trucks.

 2006 Holden VZ Commodore - Those built from February 2006 until July 2006 until the release of the VE series.
 2006 Holden WL Statesman/Caprice - Those built from February 2006 until September 2006 until the release of the WM series.
 2008–2009 Pontiac G8 GT
 2008–2010 Holden VE Commodore (automatic only)
 2008–2010 Holden VE Ute (automatic only)
 2008–2010 Holden WM Statesman/Caprice
 2007–2009 Chevrolet Suburban
 2007–2009 Chevrolet Avalanche
 2007–2009 Chevrolet Silverado
 2007–2009 GMC Sierra
 2007–2009 GMC Yukon XL
 2020 Ginetta Akula

L98

The L98 is a slightly modified version of the L76. Since Holden did not use the displacement on demand technology of the L76, some redundant hardware was removed to form the L98.

 2006–2007 Holden VZ Ute
 2006–2010 Holden VE Commodore (manual only from 2008 to 2010)
 2006–2009 Holden VE Calais
 2006–2010 Holden VE Ute (manual only from 2008 to 2010)
 2006–2008 Holden WM Statesman/Caprice

L77
 L77 can also refer to the 455 Oldsmobile large crank journal engine.

L77 engines were released in the Holden Commodore Series II VE range in both manual and automatic transmissions, along with the Chevrolet Caprice PPV (police car). The L77 differs from the L76 with its inclusion of Flex-fuel capability, allowing it to run on E85 ethanol.

 2010–2013 Holden VE II Commodore
 2013–2015 Holden VF Commodore
 2010–2013 Holden VE II Ute
 2013–2015 Holden VF Ute
 2010–2013 Holden WM Caprice
 2013–2015 Holden WN Caprice
 2011–2017 Chevrolet Caprice PPV

LY6
The LY6 is a Generation IV small-block V8 truck engine with a cast-iron block. It shares the same bore and stroke as its LQ4 predecessor. Like other Gen IV engines, it features variable valve timing. Redline is 6,000 rpm and the compression ratio is 9.6:1. This engine uses L92 / LS3 style rectangle port cylinder heads, though without the sodium-filled exhaust valves of the LS3.

Applications:

 2007–2009 Chevrolet Silverado HD
 2007–2009 GMC Sierra HD
 2007–2013 Chevrolet Suburban 3/4 ton
 2007–2013 GMC Yukon XL 3/4 ton

L96
The L96 is essentially identical to its predecessor, the LY6.  The primary difference is that the L96 is Flex-Fuel capable, while the LY6 is not.

 2010–2019 Chevrolet Silverado HD
 2010–2019 GMC Sierra HD
 2010–2013 Chevrolet Suburban 3/4 ton
 2010–2013 GMC Yukon XL 3/4 ton
 2016–2020 Chevrolet Suburban 3500
 2010–2020 Chevrolet Express/GMC Savana

LFA
The LFA is a Generation IV small block V8 truck engine. The LFA variant is used in the GM's "two mode" hybrid GMT900 trucks and SUVs, and is an all-aluminum design. Engine VIN code of 5.

In 2008 this engine was selected by Wards as one of the 10 best engines in any regular production vehicle.

 2008–2009 Chevrolet Tahoe Hybrid
 2008–2009 GMC Yukon Hybrid
 2008–2009 Cadillac Escalade Hybrid
 2008–2009 Chevrolet Silverado Hybrid
 2008–2009 GMC Sierra Hybrid

LZ1
The LZ1 is almost entirely based on its predecessor, the LFA, but with some revisions, such as including up-integrated electronic throttle control, long-life spark plugs, GM's Oil Life System, Active Fuel Management and variable valve timing. It has the same compression ratio, power and torque ratings as its predecessor, the LFA.

 2010–2013 Chevrolet Tahoe Hybrid
 2010–2013 GMC Yukon Hybrid
 2010–2013 Cadillac Escalade Hybrid
 2010–2013 Chevrolet Silverado Hybrid
 2010–2013 GMC Sierra Hybrid

3.78 in. bore blocks (2005–present)
This family of blocks is just an updated version of its Generation III predecessor with Generation IV updates and capabilities.  Applications of this family were mainly for trucks but did see some mild usage (with some modifications) in front-wheel-drive cars.

4.8 L

LY2
The Vortec 4800 LY2 (VIN code "C") is a Generation IV small-block V8 truck engine. The smallest member of the Generation IV engine family is unique in that it is the only member of that family that is used in trucks that do not feature variable valve timing. It has a cast-iron block.

Applications:
 2008–2009 Chevrolet Express/GMC Savana
 2007–2009 Chevrolet Silverado
 2007–2009 Chevrolet Tahoe
 2007–2009 GMC Sierra
 2007–2009 GMC Yukon

L20
The Vortec 4800 L20 makes more power and features variable valve timing. The system adjusts both intake and exhaust timing but does not come with Active Fuel Management. The Vortec 4800 base engines were dropped from the Chevrolet Tahoe and GMC Yukon in favor of the 5300 with Active Fuel Management.
 
Applications:
 2010–2017 Chevrolet Express/GMC Savana
 2010–2013 Chevrolet Silverado
 2010–2013 GMC Sierra

5.3 L
The Generation IV 5.3L engines share all the improvements and refinements found in other Generation IV engines.  8 versions of the Gen IV 5.3L engine were produced: 3 iron blocks (LY5, LMG, and LMF) and 5 aluminum blocks (LH6, LH8, LH9, LC9, and LS4). All versions featured Active Fuel Management except for the LH8, LH9, and LMF.

LH6
The Vortec 5300 LH6 (VIN code "M") with Active Fuel Management replaced the LM4 for 2005, and was the first of the Generation IV small block V8 truck engines to go into production. It is the aluminum block counterpart to the LY5.

 2005–2009 Chevrolet TrailBlazer including EXT (through 2006)
 2005–2009 GMC Envoy Denali
 2005–2006 GMC Envoy XL
 2005 GMC Envoy XUV
 2005–2007 Buick Rainier
 2005–2009 Saab 9-7X
 2005–2007 Isuzu Ascender
 2007–2009 Chevrolet Silverado 1500
 2007–2009 GMC Sierra 1500

LS4
LS4 can also refer to a  Chevrolet Big-Block engine of the 1970s

The LS4 is a  version of the Generation IV block. Though it has the same displacement as the Vortec 5300 LY5, it features an aluminum block instead of iron, and uses the same cylinder head casting as the Generation III LS6 engine. The LS4 is adapted for transverse front-wheel drive applications, with a bell-housing bolt pattern that differs from the rear-wheel-drive blocks (so as to mate with the 4T65E).

The water pump is mounted remotely with an elongated pump manifold that connects it to the coolant passages. Revised oil pan baffles, or windage trays, are incorporated into the LS4 to ensure that the oil sump stays loaded during high-g cornering." Active Fuel Management is also used.

Applications:
 2005–2008 Pontiac Grand Prix GXP
 2006–2009 Chevrolet Impala SS
 2006–2007 Chevrolet Monte Carlo SS
 2008–2009 Buick LaCrosse Super

LY5
Introduced in 2007, the Vortec 5300 LY5 (VIN code "J") is the replacement for the LM7 Generation III engine.

 2007–2013 Chevrolet Avalanche
 2007–2013 Chevrolet Silverado 1500
 2007–2014 Chevrolet Suburban  ton
 2007–2014 Chevrolet Tahoe
 2007–2013 GMC Sierra 1500
 2007–2014 GMC Yukon
 2007–2014 GMC Yukon XL  ton

LC9

The Vortec 5300 LC9 (VIN code "3" or "7") is the aluminum block Flex-Fuel version of the LH6, and is found in 4WD models. Variable valve timing was added for the 2010 model year.

Applications:
 2007–2013 Chevrolet Avalanche
 2007–2013 Chevrolet Silverado 1500
 2007–2014 Chevrolet Suburban  ton
 2007–2013 GMC Sierra 1500
 2007–2014 GMC Yukon XL  ton

LMG

The Vortec 5300 LMG (VIN code "0") is the flexible-fuel version of the LY5. Power and torque ratings for SUV and pickup truck applications are the same as each application's LY5 rating. Variable valve timing was added for the 2010 model year. Active Fuel Management is standard on this model for fuel economy purposes.

 2007–2013 Chevrolet Avalanche
 2007–2013 Chevrolet Silverado 1500
 2007–2014 Chevrolet Suburban  ton
 2007–2014 Chevrolet Tahoe
 2007–2013 GMC Sierra 1500
 2007–2014 GMC Yukon
 2007–2014 GMC Yukon XL  ton

LH8

The LH8 was introduced in 2008 as the V8 option for the Hummer H3. It was the simplest most basic 5.3L V8 of its family, lacking any special technologies. Also known as the Vortec 5300, the LH8 was available in the H3 and GM mid-size pickups through 2009.

The LH8 is a variant of the 5.3 L Gen IV small block V8 modified to fit in the engine bay of the GMT 345 SUV and GMT 355 trucks.

Applications:
 2008–2009 Hummer H3 Alpha
 2009 Chevrolet Colorado/GMC Canyon

LH9
In 2010, the LH8 was replaced by the LH9. The LH9 was upgraded with Variable Valve Timing (VVT) and flex fuel capability (but not Active Fuel Management). The compression ratio was 9.9:1 for 2010, but was reduced to 9.7:1 for the remaining two years of production.

Applications:

 2010 Hummer H3 Alpha
 2010–2012 Chevrolet Colorado/GMC Canyon

LMF
Introduced in 2010, the LMF is a low-tech LY5, used in the lower volume half-ton AWD cargo vans that still used the 4L60E 4-speed automatic, lacking Active Fuel Management. The LMF features variable valve timing.

Applications:

 2010–2014 Chevrolet Express  ton AWD
 2010–2014 GMC Savana  ton AWD

4.125 in. bore blocks (2006–present)
Inspired by the LS1.R in size and performance goals, this family of blocks was designed for race-oriented performance.  The only engine with this bore size that was used in a production vehicle is the LS7 with the LSX being only for aftermarket use.  One unique feature of this family is that the cylinders are siamesed, no water passages between neighboring cylinders.  This was done to increase both bore size and block strength.

7.0 L

LS7
LS7 can also refer to a 454 over the counter 460+ hp high compression engine Chevrolet Big-Block engine of the 1970s

The LS7 is a  engine, based on the Gen IV architecture. The block is changed, with sleeved cylinders in an aluminum block with a larger bore  and longer stroke  than the LS2. The small-block's  bore spacing is retained, requiring pressed-in cylinder liners. The crankshaft and main bearing caps are forged steel for durability, the connecting rods are forged titanium, and the pistons are hypereutectic.

During GM's reliability testing of this engine in its prototype phase, the LS7 was remarked to have been repeatedly tested to be 8000 rpm capable, although power was not recorded at that rpm level, due to the constraints of the camshaft's hydraulic lifters and the intake manifold ability to flow required air at that engine speed.

The LS7 is hand-built by the General Motors Performance Build Center in Wixom, Michigan. Most of these engines are installed in the Z06, some are also sold to individuals by GM as a crate engine. The 2014 and 2015 Z28 were the only Camaros to receive the 427 LS7. As of early 2022, the LS7 is no longer being supplied as a crate engine, with Chevrolet intending to fulfill all current orders until inventory is depleted.

After an extensive engineering process over several years, Holden Special Vehicles fitted the LS7 to a special edition model: the W427. It was unveiled at the Melbourne International Motor Show on February 29, 2008 and went on sale in August 2008.

 2006–2013 Chevrolet Corvette Z06
 2013 Corvette 427 Convertible
 2014–2015 Chevrolet Camaro Z/28
 Vertical Hummingbird helicopter

4.06 in. bore blocks (2007–present)
This family was designed as a replacement for the LS2 but enlarged to better accommodate variable valve timing and Active Fuel Management while still generating good performance.  This family of engines has mainly seen duty in performance cars and high-end SUVs.

6.2 L

L92
The 2007 Cadillac Escalade has a  Vortec 6200 (RPO L92) engine. It is an all-aluminum design which, while still a pushrod engine, boasts variable valve timing. The system adjusts both intake and exhaust timing between two settings. Engines built prior to April 1, 2006, contained AFM components, but the software was not present in the PCM and thus the system was not functional. Engines built after this date did not have any AFM components, and instead used a valley cover plate similar to the L20, save for the L94 variants mentioned below.

The 2009 L92 was modified with Flex Fuel capability, becoming the L9H. In 2010, the L9H was further modified with Active Fuel Management, becoming the L94 (in the Cadillac Escalade and GMC Yukon Denali).

 2007–2013 Cadillac Escalade (L9H for MY 2009, L94 for MY 2010–2013)
 2008–2009 Chevrolet Tahoe
 2007–2013 GMC Yukon Denali/Denali XL
 2007–2013 GMC Sierra Denali
 2008–2009 Hummer H2
 2009–2013 Chevrolet Silverado 1500 (as RPO code L9H)
 2009–2013 GMC Sierra 1500 (as RPO code L9H)

LS3
 LS3 can also refer to a  Chevrolet Big-Block engine of the 1970s

The LS3 was introduced as the Corvette's new base engine for the 2008 model year. It also features higher flowing cylinder heads sourced from the L92, a more aggressive camshaft with  lift, a 10.7:1 compression ratio, a revised valvetrain with  offset intake rocker arms, a high-flow intake manifold and /hr fuel injectors from the LS7 engine.

The L76/L92/LS3 cylinder heads use  intake valves, and  exhaust valves. Improved manufacturing efficiency makes these heads cheaper to produce than the outgoing LS6 heads, significantly undercutting the price of aftermarket heads. The large valves, however, limit maximum rpm - 6000 in the L76 (with AFM), and 6600 in the LS3 (with hollow stem valves).

In addition to the above, a dual-mode exhaust package with a bypass on acceleration was available on C6 Corvettes. The dual-mode exhaust uses vacuum-actuated outlet valves, which control engine noise during low-load operation, but open for maximum performance during high-load operation. The system is similar to the C6 Z06, but uses a  diameter exhaust compared to the Z06's . A similar system was optional on later model 5th generation Chevrolet Camaros and standard on the 2016–2017 Chevrolet SS, but no horsepower or torque increases were advertised on those vehicles. 

LS3 engines found in manual transmission-equipped C6 Corvette Grand Sport models also received a dry sump oiling system similar to the one fitted to LS7-equipped Corvettes.

From April 2008, Australian performance car manufacturer HSV adopted the LS3 as its standard V8 throughout the range, replacing the LS2. The LS3 received modifications for its application to HSV E Series models, producing . The LS3 engine in the E Series II GTS (released September 2009) was upgraded to produce . All HSV MY12.5 excluding the base Maloo and Clubsport variants have been upgraded to produce .

From September 2015 Holden introduced the LS3 in all V8 models of the VF II Commodore and WN II Caprice-V, replacing the 6.0L L77.

 2008–2013 Chevrolet Corvette
 2011  Jensen Interceptor R
 2010–2015 Chevrolet Camaro SS (manual only)
 2015 Drakan Spyder
 2008–2017 Various Holden vehicles including:
 2009 Pontiac G8 GXP
 2014–2017 Chevrolet SS

L99

The L99 is derived from the LS3 with reduced output but adds Active Fuel Management (formerly called Displacement on Demand) and variable valve timing, which allows it to run on only four cylinders during light load conditions.

Applications:

 2010–2015 Chevrolet Camaro SS (Automatic Transmission)

LS9
The Gen IV LS9 is a supercharged  engine, based on the LS3; the LS7 block was not used due to the higher cylinder pressures created by the supercharger requiring the thicker cylinder walls of the LS3. It is equipped with an Eaton four-lobe Roots type supercharger and has a compression ratio of 9.1:1. Note: GM previously used the LS9 RPO code on 1969 and later Chevrolet trucks (both 2WD and 4WD) including Blazers, Jimmys, Suburbans, as well as car carriers.
In 2017, Holden Special Vehicles used a modified version of the LS9 in their GTSR W1, the last ever Holden Commodore based vehicle produced in Australia.

Applications:

 2009–2013 Chevrolet Corvette ZR1

LSA
GM labeled it "the most powerful ever offered in Cadillac's nearly 106-year history". The LSA features a smaller  capacity supercharger rather than the  variant of the LS9. Other differences include a slightly lower 9.0:1 compression ratio, single unit heat exchanger and cast pistons.

A  and  version of the LSA engine is used in the 2012 Camaro ZL1. On May 15, 2013, Holden Special Vehicles announced that this version of the LSA engine will also be used in the GEN-F GTS.

 2009–2015 Cadillac CTS-V
 2012–2015 Chevrolet Camaro ZL1
 2014–2017 HSV GTS GEN-F

Generation V (2013–present)

In 2007, wardsauto.com reported that the LS3 (used by 2008 Chevrolet Corvette) and Vortec 6000 LFA (used by 2008 Chevrolet Tahoe Hybrid) engines would be the final two designs in the Generation IV small-block engine family, and the future designs would be part of the Generation V engine family. An experimental engine was built based on L92 engine from Cadillac Escalade, GMC Yukon Denali and Hummer H2, and reported to generate  on gasoline via direct fuel injection, increased compression ratio to 11.5:1, and a modified engine controller. The first Gen V LT engine was the LT1, announced in 2012 as the initial powerplant for the redesigned Corvette C7, succeeding the LS engine family. The new logo formally adopts the Small Block name for the engines.

The fifth generation of the iconic GM small block engine family features the same cam-in-block architecture and  bore centers (the distance between the centers of each cylinder) that were born with the original small block in 1954. Structurally, the Gen-V small-block is similar to the Gen III/IV engines, including a deep-skirt cylinder block. Refinements and new or revised components are used throughout, including a revised cooling system and all-new cylinder heads. Because the positions of the intake and exhaust valves are flipped from where they would be in an LS engine, as well as the need for an addition to the camshaft to drive the high-pressure fuel pump for the direct fuel injection, few parts are interchangeable with the Gen III/IV engines.

All Gen V engines are aluminum blocks (except for the L8T) with aluminum cylinder heads, and include direct injection, piston cooling jets, active fuel management, variable displacement oil pump, and continuously variable valve timing. However, they all retain their ancestors' two-valve pushrod valvetrain.

4.06 in. bore blocks (2014–present)
This family of blocks was the first of the generation V small block with the LT1 being the progenitor of this family and generation. This family of blocks has seen a wide range of applications from performance vehicles to truck usage.

6.2 L

LT1 

The  LT1 engine debuted in the 2014 Chevrolet Corvette Stingray and is the first Generation V small block engine.

Applications:

LT2
The LT2 engine debuted in the 2020 Corvette Stingray as the successor to the LT1. It was designed specifically with mid-engine placement and dry-sump lubrication in mind.

Applications:

L86/L87 
The  EcoTec3 is a Generation V small-block V8 truck engine (VIN Code "J"). The L86 is an LT1 engine modified for truck use with a compression ratio of 11.5 to 1. In 2019, GM introduced the L87 as the successor to the L86. Power and Torque remain the same, but whereas the L86's 'Active Fuel Management' alternates between V-4 & V8 modes, the L87's 'Dynamic Fuel Management' can alternate between any of 17 different firing orders which vary both how many and which cylinder[s] are actually firing based on demand calculated every 125 milliseconds.

Applications:

LT4 

The  LT4 engine builds on the design strengths of the previous LS9 supercharged engine used in the sixth-generation Corvette ZR1 and leverages the technologies introduced on the seventh-generation Corvette Stingray, including direct injection, cylinder deactivation, and continuously variable valve timing, to take Corvette performance to an all-new level. The LT4 engine is based on the same Gen 5 small block foundation as the Corvette Stingray's LT1 6.2 L naturally aspirated engine, incorporating several unique features designed to support its higher output and the greater cylinder pressures created by forced induction, including: Rotocast A356T6 aluminum cylinder heads that are stronger and handle heat better than conventional aluminum heads, lightweight titanium intake valves, forged powder metal steel connecting rods, 10.0:1 compression ratio, enhances performance and efficiency and is enabled by direct injection, forged aluminum pistons with unique, stronger structure to ensure strength under high cylinder pressures, stainless steel exhaust manifolds for structure at higher temperatures, aluminum balancer for reduced mass, and standard dry-sump oiling system with a dual-pressure-control oil pump. The engine uses a  Eaton TVS Supercharger. Although smaller than the previous  supercharger used on the sixth-gen ZR1, it spins to 5000 rpm faster thus generating boost quicker while making only slightly less total boost than the LS9 engine. The Escalade-V variant uses a  Eaton TVS Supercharger. This engine is also used by Scuderia Cameron Glickenhaus for their SCG 004S.

Applications:

LT5 
The  LT5 engine debuted in the seventh-generation Corvette ZR1 at the 2017 Dubai Motor Show. It draws its name from the 5.7 L LT5 from the C4, and was manufactured from 1989–1993. The original LT5 is rarely known as a Chevy small block V8, as it was designed by Lotus, built by Mercury Marine, and implements a DOHC 32-valve multi-port injection system, instead of the 16-valve push-rod design. It simultaneously couples the standard direct injection system found on Gen 5 engines with port fuel injection.

Applications:

6.6 L

L8T 
The L8T is the first iron block member of the Gen V family. The compression ratio is 10.8:1. The longer stroke yields little additional peak torque output compared to the L86, but only requires 87 Octane. The stroke is also shorter than the LS7's , to optimize rod ratio for reliability.

Rather than allow a "high-strung" small block to fail the HD truck market, the iron block, lack of both stop-start and cylinder deactivation, longer stroke and rod ratio, lower compression, mere 87 Octane requirement, and greater displacement all suggest that the L8T was designed specifically to assuage the HD truck market's concerns.

Applications:

3.78 in. bore blocks (2014–present)
Unlike the previous Generation III/IV  bore block families, there is no  displacement variant (having been 'replaced' by GM's 5th Generation LT V8-based V6, the  LV3).

5.3 L

L83 
Dubbed EcoTec3  is a Generation V small block V8 truck engine (VIN Code "C").

Applications:

L8B 
The L8B is an eAssist mild hybrid version of the L83 featuring a .45-KWH lithium ion battery pack. This setup can improve fuel efficiency by about 13%.

Applications:

L82 
The L82 is one of two 5.3 liter V8s available in the 4th generation Chevrolet Silverado and 5th generation GMC Sierra. The L82 uses Active Fuel Management instead of the L84's Dynamic Fuel Management system and is only available on lower-trim trucks.

Applications:

L84 
The L84 is one of two 5.3 liter V8s available in the 4th generation Chevrolet Silverado and GMC Sierra. The L84 is distinguished from the L82 by the presence of the Dynamic Fuel Management System and is either available or standard on mid- to high-level trims. The L84 is also the base engine on the 2021- Chevrolet Tahoe, GMC Yukon, Chevrolet Suburban, & GMC Yukon XL.

Applications:

3.921 in. bore blocks (2014–present)
These V6 engines are based on the V8 version of the Gen V family, but with two fewer cylinders - a design lineage that dates back to the previous 4.3 L V6, which was itself a Gen I small block with a pair of cylinders removed.

Of special note, there were no V6 engines based on Generation II, III, or IV small-block V8s.

4.3 L
Dubbed EcoTec3  is a Generation V small block V6 truck engine. Firing order is 1-6-5-4-3-2.

This engine replaces the unrelated 4.3 L V6 whose lineage dates back to 1978.

LV3 
Applications:

LV1 
The engine is essentially the same as the LV3, but without Active Fuel Management technology. The LV1 made its debut in the 2018 model year GM full-size vans — the 2018 Chevrolet Express and 2018 GMC Savana.

Applications:

Engine table 
The 8th character in the VIN or the RPO code from the glove box sticker can be used to identify which type of LS engine a vehicle has.

 
Note 1: depending upon vehicle application (truck, suv, car); horsepower, torque, and fuel requirements will vary. VIN code indicating engine RPO is usually not consistent between vehicle types (cars or trucks) or years. with few exceptions, RPM redline is generally 6000 or higher
Note 2: block features are generally dependent upon the Generation but are not always built-in. typical features are AFM (Advanced Fuel Management), VVT (Variable Valve Train), Front Wheel Drive (FWD) and other improvements. features marked with an * indicate that only certain model years have that feature

Problems
In the early production run of the LS-series engine, some engines encountered 'piston slap' during the first few minutes after a cold engine start; this sound is caused by the pistons rocking slightly in the cylinder until they reach operating temperature/size. 'Piston slap' sometimes sounds more like a knock or the sound of a diesel engine running. It is typically only present when the engine is cold and disappears as the engine reaches operating temperature. The noise of 'piston slap' often is louder when listening for it below the oil pan.

Another common problem with the 2001–2006 5.3L engines was cracking cylinder heads. This is commonly called the 'Castech Head' failure on the internet. GM issued a TSB on this failure to help service techs identify the problem. The head casting number (which can be viewed from the passenger side of the vehicle just in front of the valve cover) was 706. Some heads with this casting number would fail (but not all of them) as GM had different suppliers for the same head. The failure was due to undetected porosity around the oil drains in the head.

Build-your-own program
In 2011, Chevrolet Performance began to offer the build your own engine program for LS7 (part number 19259944) or LS9 (part number 19259945) crate engines. It also provides customers the experience of visiting GM's unique Performance Build Center in Wixom, Michigan, where they will join a specially trained engine builder to assist in the start-to-finish assembly of the engine they purchased – from installing the crankshaft in the cylinder block to topping off the engine with its intake system. In the case of the LS9, it also means installing the supercharger assembly. Upon completion, a personalized nameplate is added to the engine.

The build-your-own engine program associated with the V8 engines, available for buyers of Chevrolet Corvette, Cadillac XLR, and certain top-spec Chevrolet Camaro models, were temporarily halted after the closure of GM Performance Build Center in Wixom, Michigan. The program's venue was reported to be relocated to the Corvette assembly plant in Bowling Green, Kentucky.

Aftermarket 
 LS7.R

The LS7.R engine is a variation of the LS7 used in the highly successful C6.R American Le Mans Series racecar. It was crowned as Global Motorsport Engine of the year by a jury of 50 race engine engineers on the Professional Motorsport World Expo 2006 in Cologne, Germany.

 LSX

LSx is also used to denote any LS engine.

At the 2006 SEMA show, GM Performance Parts introduced the LSX engine, an all-new cast-iron racing block based on the LS7 engine. It was designed with help from drag racing legend Warren Johnson. This block incorporates two extra rows of head-bolt holes per bank for increased clamping capacity. The six bolt steel main caps are the same ones used on the LS7 engine. The engine debuted at the auto show in a customized 1969 Camaro owned by Reggie Jackson. The LSX was available starting the second quarter of 2007, set to be available in authorized dealerships and retailers on March 31, 2007. The Hennessey Venom GT also uses the LSX engine based on LS7.

A  version engineered by Ilmor is used in NASCAR for the Craftsman Truck Series and the ARCA Racing Series as an option engine.  Most teams in both series (known as "NT1" in the Truck Series and the "ARCA 396" in ARCA) have switched to the engine because of cost savings, as engines must last 1,500 miles and rebuilds are about one-thirds the cost of a new engine.

 LSX376

All models use the Chevrolet Performance LSX Bowtie block.

It is designed for production-style supercharger and turbo systems used without enhancements or modifications.

 LSX454 and LSX454R

Chevrolet Performance created the 454 big-block Chevy race engine in 1970 and continued production of the crate engine through 2001. The addition of EFI and picking up the Vortec 7400 name took place in 1996 which was replaced with the 8100 series Vortec platform once the 7400 was retired. Chevrolet Performance released the 454 again in 2011 as a small-block crate engine dubbed the LSX454R officially rated at 776 horsepower at 7,000 rpm and 649 lb-ft of torque at 5,100 rpm. The LSX454R was discontinued in July 2018 but will be recorded as one of the more powerful LS crate engines to be assembled from Chevy Performance. 

 Noonan Race Engineering

Noonan Race Engineering developed two billet aluminum blocks based on the LS engine. Bore sizes are up to 4.185 in and stroke up to 4.5 in are available, making a 495 cu in displacement possible. The billet construction provides added block integrity suited to high horsepower applications. The block design incorporates turbocharger pressure feed lines in the front of the valley and oil dump ports in the side of the block to return oil to the sump. In addition to the solid block, a waterjacketed version was also designed to provide better cooling options for street or endurance purposes.  Noonan also has developed intake manifolds for the LS; specifically for turbocharging or twin turbo charging or supercharging.

See also
 Chevrolet 90° V6 engine
 General Motors Vortec engine
 List of GM engines

References

External links

 Gen 5 press kit
 History of the Gen III LS1 V8 Engine

V8 engines
Engines by model
Gasoline engines by model
small-block